The Limassol Municipal Park, also known as a Limassol Zoo is a  zoological garden in Limassol, Cyprus. It was founded by Mayor Kostas Partaside in 1956. After substantial renovations, the Limassol Zoo was reopened in 2012.

See also 

 List of zoos by country
 Captivity
 Botanical garden
 Captive animal

References 

Parks in Cyprus
Zoos